James Stewart (1566–1625), son of Mary, Queen of Scots (1542–1587) and Lord Darnley (1546–1567), was crowned King of Scotland by Adam Bothwell, Bishop of Orkney, in the Holy Rude Kirk at Stirling on 29 July 1567.

Mary, Queen of Scots was imprisoned in the island castle of Lochleven following her surrender at the Battle of Carberry Hill. On 24 July she was forced to sign abdication papers in favour of her son. Her keeper at Lochleven, William Douglas, had a legal paper drawn up on 28 July 1567, which stated that he was not present when the Queen signed this "demission" of the crown and did not know of it, and had offered to convey her to Stirling Castle for her son's coronation, which offer she refused.

On 26 July messengers were sent to Scotland's burgh towns to announce the coronation and robes were ordered for the infant king. 62 nobles and 13 commissioners for towns signed a band or contract pledging support for James as king, and to defend the Scottish Reformation.

The Scottish lords and Privy Council travelled to Stirling on 27 July bringing the crown, sceptre, and sword, known as the Honours of Scotland, from Edinburgh Castle.

Annabell Murray, Countess of Mar brought Prince James down from the castle to the Holy Rude Kirk on the afternoon of 29 July for the three hour ceremony. His mother had been crowned in the chapel in Stirling Castle on 9 September 1543.

At the start of the proceedings in the church Lord Lindsay and Lord Ruthven declared on oath that Mary had "resigned willingly without compulsion."

Accounts of the ceremony mention that Adam Bothwell, Bishop of Orkney, anointed the king and the Earl of Atholl placed the crown on his head.

An English diplomat Henry Middlemore was present. He gave a report of the event to Nicholas Throckmorton, who sent it to Elizabeth I:my cowsen Henrye Myddlemore retorned from Sterlynge to thys Towne, by whom I understand thynges have passed at Sterlynge as ensueth: The 29th day of July ... the yonge Prince was crowned in the great Churche of Sterlyng by the Bisshop of Orkneye ... Mr Knox preached and tooke a place of the Scrypture forthe of the bookes of the Kynges where Joas was crowned verye yonge to treate on. Some ceremonyes accustomablye used at the Coronation of their Princes were omytted, and many retayned. Th'oath usually to be mynistered to the Kynge this realme at his coronation was taken by the Earl of Morton and the Laird of Dun on the Prynces behalfe.

The Earl of Atholl carried the crown of honour, the Earl of Morton, the sceptre, and the Earl of Glencairn carried the sword of honour. The Earl of Mar carried the 13 month old king back to Stirling Castle.

The coronation robes of crimson and blue velvet were made by James Inglis. The fur trim was provided by Archibald Leche. Three trumpeters, James Savoy, James Weddell, and Ramsay performed at the ceremony. The Lord Lyon and other heralds attended. Messengers were sent to the burghs to proclaim the king.

James VI and Anne of Denmark were crowned as king and queen consort of England on 25 July 1603.

References

1567 in Scotland
Court of James VI and I
James VI and I
Renaissance in Scotland
Scottish monarchy
James VI
Stirling (city)